James Beck Swanston (17 September 1878 – 8 July 1957) was a Conservative member of the House of Commons of Canada. He was born in Yeovil, Ontario and became a farmer and surgeon.

He was first elected to Parliament at the Maple Creek riding in the 1930 general election after unsuccessful campaigns there in 1925 and 1926. Swanston was defeated in the 1935 federal election by Charles Evans of the Liberal party.

References

External links
 

1878 births
1957 deaths
Conservative Party of Canada (1867–1942) MPs
Farmers from Saskatchewan
Members of the House of Commons of Canada from Saskatchewan